Empress Chen (陳皇后) may refer to one of the following Chinese empresses:

Empress Chen Jiao (empress 141 BC-130 BC), Han Dynasty empress
Empress Chen Yueyi (565?-650?), Northern Zhou Dynasty empress
Empress Chen Jinfeng (893-935), Min empress
Empress Xiaojiesu (1508-1528), Ming Dynasty empress
Empress Xiaoan (d. 1596), Ming Dynasty empress

See also
Empress Zhen (disambiguation)

Chen